Verkhovsky (masculine), Verkhovskaya (feminine), or Verkhovskoye (neuter) may refer to:

Verkhovsky District, a district of Oryol Oblast, Russia
Verkhovsky (inhabited locality) (Verkhovskaya, Verkhovskoye), name of several rural localities in Russia
Anya Verkhovskaya (born ), consultant, movie producer, and activist